The Combs Hollow Historic District is a historic district in Randolph, Morris County, New Jersey and extending into Mendham Township. It includes 11 contributing buildings, 4 contributing structures, and 14 contributing sites.

Gallery of contributing properties

See also
National Register of Historic Places listings in Morris County, New Jersey

References

External links
 
 

Randolph, New Jersey
Mendham Township, New Jersey
National Register of Historic Places in Morris County, New Jersey
New Jersey Register of Historic Places
Historic districts on the National Register of Historic Places in New Jersey